The 2019–20 Northwestern State Demons basketball team represented Northwestern State University in the 2019–20 NCAA Division I men's basketball season. The Demons, led by 21st-year head coach Mike McConathy, played their home games at Prather Coliseum in Natchitoches, Louisiana as members of the Southland Conference. They finished the season 15–15, 11–9 in Southland play to finish in a tie for fourth place. They defeated Texas A&M–Corpus Christi in the first round of the Southland tournament and were set to take on Sam Houston State in the second round until the tournament was cancelled amid the COVID-19 pandemic.

Previous season
The Demons finished the 2018–19 season 11–20 overall, 6–12 in Southland play to finish in 11th place. Since only the top eight teams are eligible for the Southland tournament, they failed to qualify.

Roster

Schedule and results

|-
!colspan=12 style=| Regular season

|-
!colspan=12 style=| Southland tournament
|-

|- style="background:#bbbbbb"
| style="text-align:center"|March 12, 20205:00 pm, ESPN+
| style="text-align:center"| (5)
| vs. (4) Sam Houston StateSecond round
| colspan=2 rowspan=1 style="text-align:center"|Cancelled due to the COVID-19 pandemic
| style="text-align:center"|Merrell CenterKaty, TX
|-

Source

See also 
2019–20 Northwestern State Lady Demons basketball team

References

Northwestern State Demons basketball seasons
Northwestern State Demons
Northwestern State Demons basketball
Northwestern State Demons basketball